Cohn Bluff is a rock bluff, about  high, in the southern part of the Britannia Range. The bluff marks the south side of the terminus of Yancey Glacier at the juncture with Byrd Glacier. It was named by the Advisory Committee on Antarctic Names in association with Byrd Glacier and Yancey Glacier, after Captain J.E. Cohn, U.S. Navy, captain of USS Yancey, a cargo ship of U.S. Navy Operation Highjump, 1946–47, led by Admiral Byrd.

References
 

Cliffs of Oates Land